Aria Giovanni is an American erotic actress and model who was Penthouse magazine's Pet for the month of September 2000. She has modelled in a range of photographic styles including amateur, artistic nude, pinup, fetish, and glamour, and has also had roles in films and television shows.

Early life
Giovanni grew up in Orange County, California. She attended a junior college in San Diego, majoring in biochemistry. During an October 30, 2002 appearance on The Howard Stern Show, Giovanni revealed that her father left the family at age 10, and that she got into trouble as a child because she was frequently left to her own devices. At age 12, her mother sent her to drug rehabilitation after discovering her unconscious in her own vomit. She says that she physically developed early, and was about a C cup by the age of 12, and a DD by the time she was 14. As a child, Giovanni has stated that she was not a popular student. She characterizes herself as having grown up an "ugly duckling", and was never asked out on dates in high school.

Career
Giovanni was attending a junior college to major in Biology and waitressing five nights a week when she began modeling, having attained 17.5 credits by the semester when she was discovered. She began modeling at the end of 1999, initially to pay for college. About six months into modeling, she was made Penthouse magazine's Pet for the month of September 2000. Her pictorial was shot by Suze Randall. Around this time she was accepted to University of California, San Diego as a junior transfer student with a major in biochemistry and a minor in English writing. However, she decided not to complete college.

In 2001, Giovanni played Monica Snatch in the movie Survivors Exposed, a parody of the Survivor television series. She also appeared on the November 16, 2001, episode of the TV dating show Shipmates. The following year, she starred in Justine, which was recommended by AskMen as one of nine pornographic movies that women can enjoy.

Giovanni was Playboys Model of the Day for June 6, 2007.

In October 2008, Giovanni appeared in the first episode of James Gunn's short-form web video series, James Gunn's PG Porn, playing a role opposite Nathan Fillion. Giovanni stars on the 2010 Nerdcore Horror Calendar.

In May 2010 Giovanni was included in Complex magazine's list of The 50 Prettiest Porn Stars of All Time.

Awards and recognition

 2010 XBIZ Award Nominee - Web Babe/Starlet of the Year

Personal life
During her October 30, 2002 appearance on The Howard Stern Show, Giovanni stated that on November 3, 1998, her 21st birthday, she married her boyfriend of five years. During the same appearance, she revealed that she had been living with guitarist John 5 for the past five months and that this was the first time she dated someone in the entertainment industry. Giovanni and John 5 married in 2005, but they later divorced.

See also 

 List of Penthouse Pets

References

External links 

 
 
 

Year of birth missing (living people)
American female adult models
American pornographic film actresses
Living people
Penthouse Pets
Pornographic film actors from California
21st-century American women